Saonnet is a commune in the Calvados department in the Normandy region in northwestern France. Its population is 318 (2019).

Toponymy 
The locality was successively called Saunnet in 1254, Soanetum in 1284, then Saonet in the 15th century. Same definition as for Saon with the diminutive french suffix et.

History 
The Littry coal mines operated several mine shafts in the town between the end of the 18th century and the middle of the 19th century.

During the Battle of Normandy, the Allies built an airfield here.

Geography 
Saonnet is located thirteen kilometers west of Bayeux, in the regional natural park of the Marais du Cotentin et du Bessin. It is crossed by the river Tortonne.

Climate 
The climate that characterizes the town is qualified, in 2010, as "french oceanic climate", according to the typology of the climates of France which then had eight major types of climates in mainland France. In 2020, the town comes out of the "ocean climate" type in the classification established by Météo-France, which now only counts, at first glance, five main types of climates in mainland France. This type of climate results in mild temperatures and relatively abundant rainfall (in connection with the disturbances coming from the Atlantic), distributed throughout the year with a slight maximum from October to February.

The climatic parameters that made it possible to establish the 2010 typology include six variables for temperature and eight for precipitation, whose values correspond to the 1971-2000 normal. The seven main variables characterizing the municipality are presented in the box below.

With climate change, these variables have evolved. A study carried out in 2015 by the Directorate General for Energy and Climate supplemented by regional studies predicts that the average temperature should increase and the average rainfall decrease, with, however, strong regional variations. These changes can be seen on the nearest Météo-France meteorological station, in the town of Balleroy-sur-Drôme, commissioned in 2007 and which is 11 km away as the crow flies where the average annual temperature is 11.2°C and the amount of precipitation is 927.2 mm for the period 1981-20109. On the nearest historical meteorological station, in the town of Carpiquet, commissioned in 1945 and 33 km away, the average annual temperature changes from 10.9°C for the period 1971-2000 to 11.2°C for 1981-2010, then 11.5°C for 1991-2020.

Town Plan

Typology 
Saonnet is a rural town. It indeed one of the municipalities with little or very little density, within the meaning of the municipal density grid of INSEE.

In addition, the town is part of the Bayeux catchment area, of which it is a town. This area, which includes 29 towns, is categorized as an area with fewer than 50,000 inhabitants.

Land Usage 
The land cover of the municipality, as it appears from the European biophysical land cover database Corine Land Cover (CLC), is marked by the importance of agricultural land (100% in 2018), a proportion identical to that of 1990 (100%). The detailed breakdown in 2018 is as follows: Grassland (67.5%), Arable land (20.8%), heterogeneous agricultural areas (11.7%).

The Institut national de l'information géographique et forestière (IGN) also provides an online tool to compare the evolution over time of land use in the municipality (or territories at different scales). Several periods are accessible in the form of maps or aerial photos: the Cassini map (18th century), the general staff map (1820-1866) and the current period (1950 to today).

Administration

Demographics

In 2019, the town had 318 inhabitants, an increase of 12% compared to 2013 (Calvados: +0.72%, France excluding Mayotte: +2.17%).

Places and monuments 

 Château de Berné and its dovecote (1776) listed as a historic monument.
 Château de la Mazinière, from the 17th century.
 A 12th century church.

See also
Communes of the Calvados department

References

Notes

Communes of Calvados (department)
Calvados communes articles needing translation from French Wikipedia